Emma of France (died 935) was a French princess by birth and queen by marriage. She was also variously known as Emma Capet, Emma of Burgundy, and Emma of Neustria. She was the daughter of Robert I of France and either Aelis of Maine or Béatrice of Vermandois. Her family is known as the Robertians.

In c. 921, she married Duke Rudolph of Burgundy. Her spouse was crowned king of Western Francia on 13 July 923 at Saint-Médard de Soissons, thereby making her queen. Emma was the first Frankish queen who is known to have been crowned: she was crowned in Reims, by the bishop of Reims called Séulf, the same year but a little later than her spouse, a fact mentioned in contemporary chronicles.   

She defended her husband's right to the throne against the Carolingian claimant, Charles III "The Simple", and her brother-in-law, Herbert II of Vermandois. Emma captured Avalon in 931, and in 933 led the siege of Château Thierry against Herbert II with King Rudolph's army.  

Emma bore only one child, a son named Louis. There is a possibility that Emma also had a daughter, and (if so) that she was named Judith.

Notes

References

Sources

|-

Frankish queens consort
934 deaths
French princesses
Duchesses of Burgundy
Robertians
10th-century people from West Francia
10th-century French people
10th-century French women
Daughters of kings